Cummins Lakes Provincial Park and Protected Area is a provincial park and protected area located in the eastern interior of British Columbia, Canada. It was established on August 4, 2000 to protect mountainous wilderness along the Cummins River.

Geography
The Cummins River is a tributary of the Columbia River that forms from the glacial meltwater of the Clemenceau Icefields. As the river flows down the western slope of the Continental Ranges, it forms a trio of spectacular waterfalls that cascade into and out of a pair of alpine lakes from which the park derives its name. The river then continues down the valley before joining the southeastern arm of Kinbasket Reservoir.

Ecology
Cummins Lakes Park protects a representative portion of the Central Park Ranges ecosection and Engelmann Spruce Subalpine Fir forest.

References

Provincial parks of British Columbia
Parks in the Canadian Rockies
Columbia Country
Year of establishment missing